Luca Brasi 3 is the sixteenth mixtape by American hip hop recording artist Kevin Gates. It was released on September 28, 2018, via Bread Winners Association and Atlantic Records.

Background
Luca Brasi 3 is the third installment of the Luca Brasi series by American rapper Kevin Gates. The mixtape serves as his second release of 2018, following Chained to the City, just four months prior, as well as his first full-length release since being released from prison. To promote the project, Gates was interviewed by Beats 1's Zane Lowe, stating that "This is my first time truly being free, I always had something over my head, I was always fighting the court case, I always had a warrant or something pending. This is my first time truly enjoying life." He also stated that on Luca Brasi 3 that he mentions topics that he couldn't talk about on the first two installments.

Singles
The first two singles "Great Man" and "Money Long" were released on September 3, 2018. The music video of "Money Long" was released on September 13, 2018. The music video of "Great Man" was released on October 31, 2018.

The third single "Me Too" was released on September 20, 2018. The fourth single is "Adding Up" was released September 24, 2018. The music video was released on September 28, 2018.

Other songs
The music video for "M.A.T.A" was released December 3, 2018.

The music video for "Discussion" was released December 19, 2018.

Commercial performance
Luca Brasi 3 debuted at number four on the US Billboard 200, earning 78,000 album-equivalent units, which included 18,000 copies sold in its first week. This became Gates' third top-ten album on the chart. The album also debuted at number three on the US Top R&B/Hip-Hop Albums chart. On July 9, 2019, the mixtape was certified gold by the Recording Industry Association of America (RIAA) for combined sales and album-equivalent units of over 500,000 units in the United States.

Track listing
Writing credits adapted from Tidal

Charts

Weekly charts

Year-end charts

Certifications

References

2018 mixtape albums
Kevin Gates albums